J. E. Traver Farm is a historic home and farm complex located at Rhinebeck, Dutchess County, New York.

The late-Federal style farmhouse dates to the 1790s, with modifications in 1849 and additions in the late-19th and early 20th centuries. It is a two-story, frame, five bay center hall plan dwelling on a fieldstone foundation. It features late-19th century picturesque ornamentation and a one-story, hipped roof verandah. Also on the property are a two contributing barns and a wagon shed.

It was added to the National Register of Historic Places in 1987.

References

Houses on the National Register of Historic Places in New York (state)
Houses completed in 1795
Houses in Rhinebeck, New York
National Register of Historic Places in Dutchess County, New York